Ryan Sheridan (born ) is an assistant-coach at the Warrington Wolves and a former Ireland international rugby league footballer. Sheridan was an Ireland international and played at the 2000 Rugby League World Cup. Ryan Sheridan was one of the most influential players in the late 1990s for the Rhinos.

Playing career

1990s
Sheridan was born in Dewsbury, West Yorkshire, England, and he started his career with Dewsbury Moor ARLFC, and signed professionally with Sheffield Eagles in July 1991 making a total of 97 appearances, including 79 starts for the Sheffield Eagles in his six seasons at the club. He scored 40 tries and one drop goal.

Having joined the Leeds club in December 1996 from Sheffield Eagles Sheridan was originally seen as a utility player and in his first season mixed between scrum half and hooker. However, with the arrival of Graham Murray in 1998, Sheridan came of age and was the perfect foil to the individual brilliance of Iestyn Harris with his organisational skills. He played for the Leeds Rhinos at scrum half in their 1998 Super League Grand Final defeat by the Wigan Warriors.

Sheridan saved his best performances for the Rhinos for the Challenge Cup, a competition he seemed to have a love affair with. In 1999 he was man of the match in all three crucial games on the way to the Final against Wigan, St Helens and then Bradford in the semi-final. His incredible pinching of the ball from Danny Peacock in the latter stages of the first half turned the game on its head and assured the Rhinos place at Wembley. Indeed, in the final but for Leroy Rivett's late burst of four tries, Sheridan would surely have won the Lance Todd Trophy. He was magnificent under the twin towers, twice denying London in the opening quarter as they threatened to cause a huge upset. His last-ditch tackle on Shaun Edwards, and then Karle Hammond steadied the ship before the second half onslaught began. Ryan rose to international status in 1999 when he earned a place in the Great Britain squad that played in the 1999 Tri-Nations series Down Under. He started the first game against Australia and was then on the bench against New Zealand.

2000s
In the year 2000 Ryan teamed up with St Helens' Tommy Martyn for Ireland to form one of the most dangerous half back combinations in the 2000 Rugby League World Cup. Sheridan was outstanding for the Irish particularly in the crucial final group game against the New Zealand Māori rugby league team. Sheridan was also back to his best in the cup again claiming man of the match awards three more times, a run which continued right up until 2002 when he again scooped the award in the memorable win over Bradford Bulls at Valley Parade. Sheridan's time at Leeds was only interrupted by a serious muscle tear in 2001 which virtually ruled him out for the whole season. In total, Sheridan made 145 starts for Leeds plus 9 substitute appearances. He scored 59 tries and four drop goals to give him a total of 240 points in the Blue and Amber. He returned to representative rugby in 2002 when he captained Yorkshire in both Origin games and then represented Great Britain against Australia in Sydney in July of that year.

Ryan left the Rhinos in November 2002 and joined Super League rivals Widnes Vikings; the following year he joined Castleford Tigers (Heritage № 804).

Ryan joined and coached alongside Darryl Powell at Featherstone Rovers. When Powell left to join Castleford in 2013, Ryan followed suit and has been at the club since.

References

External links
!Great Britain Statistics at englandrl.co.uk (statistics currently missing due to not having appeared for both Great Britain, and England)
(archived by web.archive.org) The Teams: Ireland
(archived by web.archive.org) Profile at leedsrugby
Statistics at rugby.widnes.tv

1975 births
Living people
Castleford Tigers players
English people of Irish descent
English rugby league coaches
English rugby league players
Featherstone Rovers coaches
Great Britain national rugby league team players
Ireland national rugby league team players
Leeds Rhinos players
Rugby league five-eighths
Rugby league halfbacks
Rugby league players from Dewsbury
Sheffield Eagles (1984) players
Widnes Vikings players